Halim Gerai (Girey) (Crimean Halim Geray 1689–1759, حليم كراى ;) - Crimean khan from the Gerai dynasty (1756–1758), son of the Crimean khan Saadet IV Gerai, grandson of Selim I Gerai .

Life 
He was a noureddin under Mengli II Gerai (1727–1730). Having occupied the khan's throne, Halim Gerai appointed his brothers Devlet Geray and Mehmed Gerai as kalga and nureddin . Having received the Khan's title, Halim Gerai made personnel changes in the state system, entrusting important posts to his younger relatives. Some of these new appointments were unsuccessful, since not all of Halim Geray's close associates possessed the necessary management skills and thereby caused great indignation of their subjects. So, in particular, it happened with the Nogays of Budzhak and Edisan (the area between the Dnieper and the Dniester ), only recently with difficulty brought into submission by Arslan Geray . They were outraged by their new manager, Said Gerai, and again rebelled, which the other princes who had a negative attitude towards the khan were not slow to take advantage of. The most famous of the rebel khan's relatives was Kyrym Gerai . The Ottoman government, seeing that a powerful uprising erupted in the Crimean Khanate, led by Kyrym Geray, popular among the people, and that the khan actually lost control of the situation, decided to remove Halim Geray. The failure of the khan was explained by the fact that, in his youth, distinguished by many virtues, he took the throne already as a sick old man and therefore was inactive. Halim Gerai settled in Saraj Eli (Turkey) and died there a year after his resignation.

Literature 

 O. Gaivoronsky "Constellation Geraev"
 O. Gaivoronsky “The Lords of the Two Continents,” volumes 1–2
 Halim Girai “Pink bush of khans” (history of Crimean khans)

1689 births
1759 deaths
Crimean Khans
18th-century rulers in Europe